Henry Calvin Thatcher (1842—1884) was the first chief justice of the Colorado Supreme Court. He served in the position from 1876 to 1879.

Early life and education
Thatcher was born in New Buffalo, Pennsylvania on April 21, 1842. He attended Franklin & Marshall College and graduated in 1864. From there, he went to Albany Law School, where he earned a law degree in 1866. Upon graduating, he traveled to Colorado that same year.

Career
At 24-years of age, he went to Pueblo and established a law practice there.

In 1869, President U.S. Grant appointed Thatcher to serve as United States Attorney for Colorado. Thatcher resigned the position after serving a little more than a year and returned to private practice.

In 1876 he was elected as a Republican to the Colorado Supreme Court and immediately became the state's first chief justice. He got the position by luck. To create staggered terms for the state's first Supreme Court, one of the newly elected justices was to have a term of three years, the others having longer terms. However, the law stipulated that the person who drew the lot for the shorter term would become Chief Justice, and Thatcher drew the shorter straw.

Death
Thatcher died of kidney failure in San Francisco on March 20, 1884, at 41. He is buried at Roselawn Cemetery in Pueblo.

References

External links
 

Chief Justices of the Colorado Supreme Court
United States Attorneys for the District of Colorado
People from Pueblo, Colorado
Franklin & Marshall College alumni
Albany Law School alumni
1842 births
1884 deaths
19th-century American judges